Acrobelione anisopoda is a species of crustacean isopod in the Bopyridae family. It is found on the island of Príncipe. The species was first described in 1981 by R. Bourdon.

References

Crustaceans described in 1981
Cymothoida
Fauna of Príncipe
Endemic fauna of Príncipe